John Therry (1790 - 25 May 1864) was an Irish Roman Catholic priest in Sydney, Australia.

Early life
John Therry was born in Cork and was privately educated at St Patrick's College in Carlow. In 1815 he was ordained as a priest. He did parish work in Dublin and later on was secretary to the Bishop of Cork. He had heard that Catholic convicts in Australia were without a priest to minister to them, and let it be known that he would be willing to go there as a missionary. On 5 December 1819 he sailed on the Janus with another priest, the Rev. P. Conolly, as a companion. They arrived at Sydney on 3 May 1820. Unlike Father O'Flynn, who had previously arrived without government sanction and had been deported, the two priests were accredited chaplains with a salary from the government of £1000 a year each. The two men were of different temperaments and found it difficult to agree, and in 1821 Conolly went to Tasmania and remained there until his death in 1839.

St Mary's Cathedral
Therry set about his work with great enthusiasm. His chief anxiety was the need of a church, and in view of the increase in the population of Sydney in future years, it was decided that it should be on a large scale. Almost by chance the site on which St Mary's Cathedral now stands was granted by the government, subscriptions were given by generous people, including many non-Catholics, and by 1823 it had been agreed that if a fresh subscription were opened the government would give a sum "equal to the sum total of all such additional donations". Governor Macquarie had laid the foundation-stone on 29 October 1821. Governor Thomas Brisbane, who succeeded Macquarie, was tolerant and helpful, but when Governor Darling arrived in December 1825 a period of anxiety for Therry and his church set in.

In June 1826, Therry sent a letter to the Colonial Secretary, Alexander McLeay, which Darling described as "insulting" when it was sent on to the colonial office. It was certainly a tactless letter, and one that could hardly be expected to help Therry in his work (See H.R. of A., vol. XII, p. 543). He had been in conflict with Darling before, and in February 1826 Bathurst had sent instructions that his salary should be stopped. Darling had not yet received this dispatch, and he now asked that Therry should be removed. For the next 12 years, until 1837, Therry was without the official status of a government chaplain. The Rev. Father Power was appointed chaplain, a man in poor health, who was compelled at times to accept assistance from Therry, though the two men were unable to find a way of living amicably together. Power, however, died in March 1830, Therry was again alone, and the government was compelled to countenance his ministrations. He was much helped by a friendship he formed with a namesake, Roger Therry, who arrived in Sydney towards the end of 1829, held many important positions, and became a leading Roman Catholic layman.

In September 1831, Therry was supplanted by the Rev. C. V. Dowling who succeeded Power. Similar difficulties arose, but Darling had left at the end of 1830 and the arrival of the wise and just Governor Bourke gave new hope to the Roman Catholic community. In August 1832 the Rev. John McEncroe came to Sydney and established a friendship with Therry. In February 1833, Father William Bernard Ullathorne arrived and informed Therry that he had come as vicar-general, and Therry at once submitted to his authority. Ullathorne, who was young with a fine grasp of business, was at times critical of Therry's lack of this quality but realized how truly religious he was and how hard he had worked for his people. In May 1834 John Bede Polding, the first Roman Catholic bishop in Australia was appointed and arrived in September 1835. In April 1837 Therry was officially reinstated as a chaplain at a salary of £150 a year, and in April 1838 he arrived at Launceston on a mission to the church in Tasmania. In March 1839 he permanently took up his position in Tasmania as vicar-general and worked there with some success.

Suspension
The arrival of Robert William Willson, first bishop of Hobart, in May 1844 led to much unhappiness for Therry. Bishop Willson had stipulated before accepting the see that Therry should be recalled from Hobart before his arrival. This was not done and the bishop promptly removed Therry from office. Difficulties also arose concerning the responsibility for church debts, and eventually Therry was suspended from all clerical duties. He remained for two years in Tasmania and in August 1846 was transferred to Melbourne, where he gained a reputation for his charity and missionary work. After a fruitless visit to Tasmania, made in the hope of composing his differences with the bishop, he went to Sydney in 1847 and was made priest in charge at Windsor.

Return to Tasmania
In September 1848 he was again in Hobart, and remained for five years, much occupied with matters relating to the disputes over the finances.

Later life
Early in 1854 he returned to Sydney and in May 1856 again took up parish work at St Augustine's, Balmain. He seems to have had by now considerable private means, as in August 1856 he gave £2000 to the fund for the completion of the cathedral. Many friendless men had left their small belongings to him, and land granted to him in the early days had become valuable. In 1858 he was raised to the dignity of archpriest, a rank today known as vicar capitular. He enjoyed intellectual pursuits such as speculation on how to build a transatlantic telegraph. On 25 May 1864 he died after a few hours illness, working to the last day of his life.

Therry has two Sydney schools named after him, one in Balmain (FJT School Balmain) and another in Campbelltown.

Personal Papers 
The papers of Rev John Joseph Therry are held by the Mitchell Library, State Library of New South Wales, donated by the Jesuit Fathers in 1968. The papers comprise correspondence with colonial authorities, clergy papers, petitions from individuals including convicts and their families, marriage records, diaries, sermons and speeches.

References

Further reading 
 
 Gwynn, Aubrey (1924). Father John Joseph Therry : founder of the Church in Australia. Dublin: Irish Messenger Office

Sources

Biography
J.J. Eddy, John Joseph Therry - pioneer priest, Journal of the Australian Catholic Historical Society 1 (3) (1964), 1-14.

External links 

 Colonial Secretary's papers 1822-1877, State Library of Queensland- includes digitised letters written by Therry to the Colonial Secretary of New South Wales

1790 births
1864 deaths
19th-century Australian Roman Catholic priests
Burials at St Mary's Cathedral, Sydney
Alumni of Carlow College
19th-century Irish Roman Catholic priests